Arkwright is a surname, deriving from an archaic Old English term for a person who manufactures chests, and may refer to:

People
Augustus Arkwright (1821–1887), Royal Navy officer and MP for North Derbyshire
Chris Arkwright (born 1959), English professional rugby league footballer
Francis Arkwright (politician) (1846–1915), MP for East Derbyshire 1874–1880 and Member of the New Zealand Legislative Council
Francis Arkwright (cricketer) (1905–1942), English cricketer
George Arkwright (1807–1856), English politician
Godfrey Edward Pellew Arkwright (1864–1944), British musicologist
Harold Arkwright (1872–1942), English cricketer
Henry Arkwright (cricketer, born 1811) (1811–1889), English amateur cricketer
Henry Arkwright (1837–1866), English amateur cricketer
Ian Arkwright (born 1959), English professional footballer
John Stanhope Arkwright (1872–1954), British politician
John Arkwright (rugby league) (1902–1990), British rugby league footballer
Joseph Arthur Arkwright (1864–1944), British bacteriologist
Marian Arkwright (1863–1922), English composer
May Arkwright (1860–1915), suffrage leader in the early history of the Pacific Northwest of the United States
Paul Arkwright (born 1962), British ambassador
Sir Richard Arkwright (1732–1792), Englishman credited with inventing the spinning frame
Richard Arkwright junior (1755–1843), his son, who further developed his father's inventions
 Richard Arkwright (1781–1832), grandson of the inventor, MP for Rye 1813–18 and 1826–30
 Richard Arkwright (barrister) (1835–1918), barrister and Conservative politician, MP for Leominster 1866–76
Robert Arkwright (1903–1971), British Army general

In fiction
Arkwright (Open All Hours) fictional character from the British television sitcom Open All Hours
Arkwright, a 2016 novel by Allen Steele
Luther Arkwright, the protagonist of Bryan Talbot's comic book series, The Adventures of Luther Arkwright
Commander Arkwright of the Space Academy, in Tom Corbett, Space Cadet

Places
  Arkwright Town, Derbyshire, England
  Arkwright, Alabama, United States
  Arkwright, Georgia, United States
  Arkwright, New York, United States
 Arkwright, South Carolina, United States

See also
 Arkwright Scholarships in engineering, awarded in the UK

References

Occupational surnames
Surnames of English origin
English-language occupational surnames